Hoseynabad (also Romanized as Ḩoseynābād; also known as Ḩoseynābād-e Bāgh-e Sīāh and Husainābād) is a village in Bagh Safa Rural District, Sarchehan District, Bavanat County, Fars Province, Iran. At the 2006 census, its population was 429, in 93 families.

References 

Populated places in Sarchehan County